Xu Yongqing (born August 1938) is a general in the People's Liberation Army of China who served as political commissar of the People's Armed Police from 1996 to 2003.

He was a representative of the 14th National Congress of the Chinese Communist Party and a member of the 15th Central Committee of the Chinese Communist Party. He was a member of the Standing Committee of the 10th National People's Congress

Biography
Xu was born in Jiande County (now Jiande), Zhejiang, in August 1938. He enlisted in the People's Liberation Army (PLA) in December 1956, and joined the Chinese Communist Party (CCP) in the same month. In 1985, he was soon commissioned as political commissar of the 27th Group Army, participating the Sino-Vietnamese War. In February 1996, he was promoted to become political commissar of the People's Armed Police, serving in the post until his retirement in December 2003.

He was promoted to the rank of major general (shaojiang) in September 1988, lieutenant general (zhongjiang) in July 1995, and general (shangjiang) in June 2000.

References

1938 births
Living people
People from Jiande
PLA National Defence University alumni
People's Liberation Army generals from Zhejiang
People's Republic of China politicians from Zhejiang
Chinese Communist Party politicians from Zhejiang
Members of the 15th Central Committee of the Chinese Communist Party
Members of the Standing Committee of the 10th National People's Congress